Steve Reevis (August 14, 1962 – December 7, 2017) was a Native American actor and member of the Blackfeet Tribe known for his roles in the films Fargo, Last of the Dogmen, and Dances with Wolves.

Early life and education
Steve Reevis was born on August 14, 1962 in Browning, Montana, to father Lloyd "Curley" and mother Lila Reevis. The fourth oldest of six children, he had two brothers and three sisters. Reevis grew up on the Blackfeet Indian Reservation in northwestern Montana.

Reevis attended and graduated from Flandreau Indian School in Flandreau, South Dakota. Following high school graduation, he attended Haskell Indian Junior College in Lawrence, Kansas, where he received an associate of arts degree.

Career 
Reevis' first movie appearance was with his brother, Tim Reevis, as a stunt rider in the 1987 film War Party. Reevis' first acting role was in 1988 in the Universal Studios film Twins, starring Arnold Schwarzenegger and Danny DeVito. Following Twins, he was cast in a nonspeaking role as a Sioux Warrior in the 1990 Kevin Costner film, Dances with Wolves. Reevis was next cast as Chato, an Apache scout, in Geronimo: An American Legend with fellow-Native actor Wes Studi. In 1995, Reevis played Yellow Wolf in Last of the Dogmen alongside Tom Berenger and Barbara Hershey.

He was cast in the critically acclaimed 1996 film, Fargo as well as the made-for-television movie, Crazy Horse. Reevis was honored with awards for his roles in both movies by First Americans in the Arts (FAITA) in 1996. In 2004, Reevis was once again honored by FAITA for his work on the ABC series Line of Fire.

Reevis appeared in Columbia’s 2003 film The Missing, in the 2005 remake of The Longest Yard, and in TNT's 2005 miniseries Into the West. Reevis also appeared on Fox's drama series Bones.

Personal life and death
In 1991, Reevis married his wife, Macile, a member of the Choctaw tribe, an artist, and a clothing designer. Together, they lived in Morongo Valley, California and the Missoula, Montana area and had three children together. Reevis died on December 7, 2017, of undisclosed causes in Missoula, at the age of 55. At the time of his death, he was survived by his wife, their children, and three grandchildren.

Filmography

Film

Television

References

External links

1962 births
2017 deaths
People from Browning, Montana
American male film actors
American male television actors
Native American male actors
Native American actors
Male actors from Montana
People from Morongo Valley, California
Blackfeet Nation people